4/7 may refer to:
April 7 (month-day date notation)
July 4 (day-month date notation)
4/7 (number), a fraction